"On Something" is a song by the British indie rock band The Crocketts. Credited to Davey MacManus, Owen Hopkin and The Crocketts and produced by Charlie Francis, "On Something" appeared on the band's second album The Great Brain Robbery (2000) and was released as its second single on 3 July 2000.

Composition
The writer and vocalist Davey MacManus has provided the following explanation of the song's meaning:

Reception
Critical reception to "On Something" was generally positive. The music magazine Kerrang! awarded the single a rating of four out of five Ks, noting it as "one of the better tracks" on The Great Brain Robbery. The review provided the following description of the track:

The Kerrang! review also praised the single's B-sides, including the addition of the vocalist Mary Hopkin on "Host" and the "rambling prose" and "persuasive acoustic strum" of the previously unreleased song, "Opposite Ends".

A review The Great Brain Robbery in Welsh Bands Weekly identified "On Something" as a particular highlight of the album, claiming that it was "much more the style we're used to from [the band]" and comparing its sound to that of Terrorvision. Daniel Booth of Melody Maker was less positive, simply summarising "On Something" as "a gormless Pavement".

Track listing

Personnel
The Crocketts
Davey MacManus ("Davey Crockett") – vocals, guitar
Dan Harris ("Dan Boone") – guitar
Richard Carter ("Rich Wurzel") – bass guitar
Owen Hopkin ("Owen Cash") – drums
Guest musicians
Mary Hopkin – additional vocals on "Host"
Additional personnel
Charlie Francis – production on "On Something" (Wheatley mix), "Host" and "Beauty and the Beast", mixing on "Host" and "Beauty and the Beast"
Simon Askew – production and mixing on "On Something" (BBC live) and "Ella Luciano" (BBC live)
George Thomas – production assistance and mixing assistance on "On Something" (BBC live) and "Ella Luciano" (BBC live)
Jeremy Wheatley – mixing on "On Something" (Wheatley mix)
Curig Huws – recording on "Opposite Ends" (early demo)

References

2000 singles
The Crocketts songs
2000 songs